, formerly Maebashi Kyoai Gakuen College, is a private university in Maebashi, Gunma, Japan. The predecessor of the school, a women's school, was founded in 1888, and it was chartered as a junior college in 1988. In 1999 the school became a co-educational four-year college. The college is associated with the United Church of Christ in Japan.

External links
 Official website 

Educational institutions established in 1988
Christian universities and colleges in Japan
Private universities and colleges in Japan
Universities and colleges in Gunma Prefecture
Maebashi
1988 establishments in Japan